Haemoproteus concavocentralis is a parasite first found in the hawfinch (Coccothraustes coccothraustes) in Bulgaria. The species can be distinguished from other avian haemoproteids due to an unfilled concave space between the central part of its advanced gametocytes and erythrocyte nucleus.

References

Further reading
Golemansky, Vassil. "Checklist of Haemosporidian and Piroplasmid Parasites (Apicomplexa: Haemospororida and Pirolasmorida) of Man and Animals in Bulgaria."

Parasites of birds
Haemosporida